Paul Jones Davis (February 19, 1881 – April 26, 1947) was an American football and baseball player, coach of football, basketball, and baseball, and college athletic administrator. He served as the head football coach at Dickinson College (1908), Oklahoma Agricultural and Mechanical College—now known as Oklahoma State University (1909–1914), North Dakota Agricultural College—now known as North Dakota State University (1915–1917), and University of North Dakota (1920–1924), and Mansfield State Teachers College—now known as Mansfield University of Pennsylvania (1932–1937). Davis was also the head basketball coach at Oklahoma A&M (1911–1915), North Dakota Agricultural (1915–1918), and North Dakota (1920–1924), amassing a career college basketball coaching mark of 112–44. In addition, he was the head baseball coach at Oklahoma A&M from 1909 to 1915, tallying a record of 54–40–1.

Coaching career
Davis was the eighth head football coach at Dickinson College in Carlisle, Pennsylvania, serving for one season, in 1908, and compiling a record of 5–4. From 1911 to 1915, he coached at Oklahoma A&M. He spent the 1911-13 seasons, coaching football compiling a 30-17-1 record. From 1914-15, he coached basketball and compiled a 15-16 record. At his time at A&M, he coached baseball and served as athletic director. From 1915 to 1917, he coached at North Dakota Agricultural, where he compiled a 10–7–1 record.

Personal life
Davis married Florence Eva Baxter.

Head coaching record

Football

References

1881 births
1947 deaths
Basketball coaches from Virginia
Dickinson Red Devils baseball players
Dickinson Red Devils football coaches
Dickinson Red Devils football players
Mansfield Mounties football coaches
Mansfield Mountaineers men's basketball coaches
North Dakota State Bison athletic directors
North Dakota State Bison football coaches
North Dakota State Bison men's basketball coaches
North Dakota Fighting Hawks athletic directors
North Dakota Fighting Hawks football coaches
North Dakota Fighting Hawks men's basketball coaches
Oklahoma State Cowboys and Cowgirls athletic directors
Oklahoma State Cowboys baseball coaches
Oklahoma State Cowboys basketball coaches
Oklahoma State Cowboys football coaches
Sportspeople from Williamsburg, Virginia